The 2009–10 Duke Blue Devils men's basketball team represented Duke University in the 2009–10 NCAA Division I men's basketball season. Led by Head Coach Mike Krzyzewski, the Blue Devils won the 2010 NCAA Division I men's basketball tournament, claiming the school's fourth national title.

Duke led the ACC in scoring margin (+16.2), free throw percentage (.761), 3-point field goal percentage (.382), 3-point field goal defense (.278), 3-point field goals made (7.4 per game), rebounding margin (+6.5), and offensive rebound percentage (.410).

All-American point guard Jon Scheyer was the team leader in points per game (18.2), assists (4.9), free throw percentage (.878), and steals per game (1.6), forward Kyle Singler led in 3-point field goal percentage (.399), center Brian Zoubek led in rebounds per game (7.6), and reserve forward Mason Plumlee led in blocks per game (.9).

Individual-game season-highs were Scheyer in points (36), assists (11), and steals (5; twice), Singler in 3-point field goals (8), Zoubek in rebounds (17), and Mason Plumlee and Ryan Kelly in blocks (4).

Scheyer, Singler, and Nolan Smith each scored over 600 points during the season.  In 2001–02, Jason Williams, Carlos Boozer, and Mike Dunleavy, Jr. were the first trio to accomplish that feat for Duke.  Scheyer (728) and Singler (707) both scored over 700 points, a feat previously accomplished by Jason Williams (841) and Shane Battier (778) in 2001.

Coach K said:  I've said throughout the year they were good, then they were really good, then they were really good with great character. But I told them [after the championship game] before we said a prayer, that: 'You are a great team.'

Pre-season

Recruiting

Roster

 Curry transferred from Liberty University before the season and thus was ineligible to play during the 2009–10 season, per NCAA rules.
 Czyz transferred to the University of Nevada, Reno in mid-season.

Rankings

Schedule

|-
!colspan=9 style=| Exhibition

|-
!colspan=9 style=| Regular Season

|-
!colspan=12 style=| ACC Tournament

|-
!colspan=12 style=| NCAA tournament

Accomplishments
17–0 at home
13–0 on neutral courts
NIT Season Tip-Off Champions
ACC Regular season Co-Champions
ACC Tournament Champions, two in a row and 9 out of the last 12
15th consecutive NCAA tournament
NCAA Champions, fourth in school history
National Titles in three straight decades
Mike Krzyzewski ties Adolph Rupp of Kentucky for second most NCAA titles by a Division I head coach
Played in national championship game 4 of the last 12 seasons
15th Final Four appearance and 10th out of the last 23 years
35 victories is tied for third most in Duke history
65 victories the past two seasons, most in the NCAA

Team highs
Most Points Scored: 114 vs. Pennsylvania, 12/31
Highest Point Differential: 59 vs. Pennsylvania, 12/31
Most Field Goals Made: 43 vs. Gardner-Webb, 12/15
Most Three Point Field Goals: 18 vs Radford, 11/21
Most Rebounds: 56 vs. University of Connecticut, 11/27
Most Assists: 27 vs. Gardner-Webb, 12/15
Highest Assist-to-Turnover Ratio: 3.33 vs. West Virginia, 4/3 (Elite Eight; 20 assists to 6 turnovers)
Most Blocks: 10 vs. Long Beach State, 12/29

Individual season highs
Most Points: 36, Jon Scheyer vs. Gardner-Webb, 12/15
Most Offensive Rebounds: 8, Brian Zoubek three times and Lance Thomas vs. Baylor (3/28)
Most Defensive Rebounds: 10, Miles Plumlee vs. Charlotte (11/17) and Brian Zoubek vs. Purdue (3/26)
Most Three-Point Field Goals: 8, Kyle Singler vs. Georgia Tech, 2/4
Most Assists: 11, Jon Scheyer vs. Pennsylvania, 12/31
Most Steals: 5, Jon Scheyer three times, Brian Zoubek at Miami
Most Blocks: 4, Ryan Kelly vs. Gonzaga (12/19) and Mason Plumlee vs. Long Beach State (12/29)

ACC season leaders
Scheyer set the ACC all-time single-season record for minutes played (1,470).
Scheyer led the ACC in assist/turnover ratio (3.0; 2nd-best in Duke history), free throw percentage (.878; 7th-best in Duke history), and 3-point FGs made (2.8 per game).

Individual honors
Jon Scheyer was a 2009–10 consensus All-American (Second Team), a Wooden and Lowe's Senior First Team All-American, and was named to the Associated Press, USBWA, National Association of Basketball Coaches (NABC), and Sporting News All-America second teams
 Scheyer was also an ACC All-Tournament First Team pick and an NCAA South All-Regional and All-Final Four Team selection, was named to the NABC and USBWA 2009–10 All-District teams, and was awarded the NABC Senior Achievement Award
Kyle Singler made the Sporting News All-America fifth team
Singler was voted as the Final Four Most Outstanding Player.  Scheyer and Nolan Smith were named to the All-Final Four Team.
Scheyer (unanimous) and Singler were first team All-ACC
Nolan Smith was second team All-ACC
Lance Thomas named to ACC All-Defensive Team
Brian Zoubek and Ryan Kelly named to ACC All-Academic Team

Local radio

See also
 2009–10 Duke Blue Devils women's basketball team

References

Duke Blue Devils
Duke Blue Devils men's basketball seasons
Duke Blue Devils
NCAA Division I men's basketball tournament Final Four seasons
NCAA Division I men's basketball tournament championship seasons
Duke
Duke